Aszonalenin is an alkaloid which is produced by Neosartorya and Aspergillus species. Aszonalenin is a neurotoxin.

References

Further reading 

 
 

Mycotoxins
Indolines
Allyl compounds
Lactams